The planetary equilibrium temperature is a theoretical temperature that a planet would be if it were a black body being heated only by its parent star. In this model, the presence or absence of an atmosphere (and therefore any greenhouse effect) is irrelevant, as the equilibrium temperature is calculated purely from a balance with incident stellar energy.

Other authors use different names for this concept, such as equivalent blackbody temperature of a planet, or the effective radiation emission temperature of the planet. Planetary equilibrium temperature differs from the global mean temperature and surface air temperature, which are measured observationally by satellites or surface-based instruments, and may be warmer than an equilibrium temperature due to greenhouse effects.

Calculation of equilibrium temperature

Consider a planet orbiting its host star. The star emits radiation isotropically, and some fraction of this radiation reaches the planet. The amount of radiation arriving at the planet is referred to as the incident solar radiation,  .  The planet has an albedo that depends on the characteristics of its surface and atmosphere, and therefore only absorbs a fraction of radiation. The planet absorbs the radiation that isn't reflected by the albedo, and heats up. One may assume that the planet radiates energy like a blackbody at some temperature according to the Stefan–Boltzmann law. Thermal equilibrium exists when the power supplied by the star is equal to the power emitted by the planet. The temperature at which this balance occurs is the planetary equilibrium temperature.

Derivation 
The solar flux absorbed by the planet from the star is equal to the flux emitted by the planet:

Assuming a fraction of the incident sunlight is reflected according to the planet's Bond albedo, :

where   represents the area- and time-averaged incident solar flux, and may be expressed as:

The factor of 1/4 in the above formula comes from the fact that only a single hemisphere is lit at any moment in time (creates a factor of 1/2), and from integrating over angles of incident sunlight on the lit hemisphere (creating another factor of 1/2).

Assuming the planet radiates as a blackbody according to the Stefan–Boltzmann law at some equilibrium temperature , a balance of the absorbed and outgoing fluxes produces:

 where  is the Stefan-Boltzmann constant.

Rearranging the above equation to find the equilibrium temperature leads to:

Calculation for extrasolar planets
For a planet around another star, (the incident stellar flux on the planet) is not a readily measurable quantity. To find the equilibrium temperature of such a planet, it may be useful to approximate the host star's radiation as a blackbody as well, such that:

The luminosity of the star, which can be measured from observations of the star's apparent brightness, can then be written as:

 where the flux has been multiplied by the surface area of the star.

To find the incident stellar flux on the planet, at some orbital distance from the star, one can divide by the surface area of a sphere with radius :

Plugging this into the general equation for planetary equilibrium temperature gives:

If the luminosity of the star is known from photometric observations, the other remaining variables that must be determined are the Bond albedo and orbital distance of the planet. Bond albedos of exoplanets can be constrained by flux measurements of transiting exoplanets, and may in future be obtainable from direct imaging of exoplanets and a conversion from geometric albedo. Orbital properties of the planet such as the orbital distance can be measured through radial velocity and transit period measurements.

Alternatively, the planetary equilibrium may be written in terms of the temperature and radius of the star:

Caveats 
The equilibrium temperature is neither an upper nor lower bound on actual temperatures on a planet. There are several reasons why measured temperatures deviate from predicted equilibrium temperatures.

Greenhouse effect 
Because of the greenhouse effect, wherein long wave radiation emitted by the planet is absorbed and re-emitted to the surface by certain gases in the atmosphere, planets with substantial greenhouse atmospheres will have surface temperatures higher than the equilibrium temperature. The equilibrium temperatures of such planets are more accurately estimated using simple energy-balance models which include one or more levels of thermal radiation transport through the atmosphere.

Airless bodies 
There are large variations in surface temperature over space and time on airless or near-airless bodies like Mars, which has daily surface temperature variations of 50-60 K. Because of a relative lack of air to transport or retain heat, significant variations in temperature develop. Assuming the planet radiates as a blackbody (i.e. according to the Stefan-Boltzmann law), temperature variations propagate into emission variations, this time to the power of 4. This is significant because our understanding of planetary temperatures comes not from direct measurement of the temperatures, but from measurements of the fluxes. Consequently, in order to derive a meaningful mean surface temperature on an airless body (to compare with an equilibrium temperature), a global average surface emission flux is considered, and then an 'effective temperature of emission' that would produce such a flux is calculated. Again, these temperature variations result from poor heat transport and retention in the absence of an atmosphere.

Internal energy fluxes 
Orbiting bodies can also be heated by tidal heating, geothermal energy which is driven by radioactive decay in the core of the planet, or accretional heating. These internal processes will cause the effective temperature (a blackbody temperature that produces the observed radiation from a planet) to be warmer than the equilibrium temperature (the blackbody temperature that one would expect from solar heating alone). For example, on Saturn, the effective temperature is approximately 95 K, compared to an equilibrium temperature of about 63 K. This corresponds to a ratio between power emitted and solar power received of ~2.4, indicating a significant internal energy source. Jupiter and Neptune have ratios of power emitted to solar power received of 2.5 and 2.7, respectively. Close correlation between the effective temperature and equilibrium temperature of Uranus can be taken as evidence that processes producing an internal flux are negligible on Uranus compared to the other giant planets.

See also
Effective temperature
Thermal equilibrium
Earth's energy budget

References

Sources

External links
Equilibrium Temperature at the Laboratory for Atmospheric and Space Physics, University of Colorado
Energy balance: the simplest climate model
HEC: Exoplanets Calculator Features a user friendly calculator to calculate the Planet Equilibrium Temperature.

Thermodynamics
Planetary science